The 2014 United States House of Representatives elections in Oklahoma were held on Tuesday, November 4, 2014 to elect the five U.S. representatives from the state of Oklahoma, one from each of the state's five congressional districts. The elections coincided with other elections to the United States Senate and House of Representatives and various state and local elections, including the Governor of Oklahoma and both of Oklahoma's United States Senate seats. Primary elections were held on June 24, 2014. Primary runoffs were held on August 26, 2014, in contests where no candidate won more than 50% of the vote.

Overview
Results of the 2014 United States House of Representatives elections in Oklahoma by district:

District 1

The 1st district is located in the Tulsa metropolitan area and includes Creek, Rogers, Tulsa, Wagoner and Washington counties. The incumbent is Republican Jim Bridenstine, who has represented the district since 2013. He was elected with 64% of the vote in 2012 having defeated incumbent Republican John Sullivan in the Republican primary with 54% of the vote. The district has a PVI of R+18.

Bridenstine ran unopposed for re-election. Former Mayor of Tulsa Kathy Taylor was a potential Democratic candidate, but she declined to run.

District 2

The 2nd district is located in Green Country and Kiamichi Country and includes the city of Muskogee and numerous sparsely populated counties. The incumbent is Republican Markwayne Mullin, who has represented the district since 2013. He was elected with 57% of the vote in 2012, succeeding retiring Democratic incumbent Dan Boren. The district has a PVI of R+20.

Republican primary
Darrell Robertson challenged Mullin in the Republican primary.

Results

Democratic primary
Earl E. Everett, a candidate for the seat in 2012, and Joshua Harris-Till ran for the Democrats.

Results

General election

Results

District 3

The 3rd district is located in Western Oklahoma. The largest district in Oklahoma and one of the largest in the country, it includes the Oklahoma Panhandle, Ponca City and the city of Stillwater as well as the Osage Nation. The incumbent is Republican Frank Lucas, who has represented the district since 2003 and previously represented the 6th district from 1994 to 2003. He was re-elected with 75% of the vote in 2012 and the district has a PVI of R+26.

Republican primary
The Club for Growth announced that they intended to support a Republican challenger to Lucas in the primary election, calling him a "Republican In Name Only". Businessman and candidate for Governor in 2010 Robert Hubbard and businessman and Democratic nominee for the seat in 2012 Timothy Ray Murray both ran against Lucas in the Republican primary.

Results

Democratic primary
Democrat Frankie Robbins, an engineer and United States Forest Service employee who was a candidate for the seat in 2012 and the nominee for the seat in 2008 and 2010 is the only other candidate running.

General election

Results

District 4

The 4th district is located in South Central Oklahoma and includes Canadian, Comanche and Cleveland counties as well as numerous other sparsely populated counties. The incumbent is Republican Tom Cole, who has represented the district since 2003. He was re-elected with 68% of the vote in 2012 and the district has a PVI of R+19.

Republican primary
Anna Flatt, chairman of the Carter County Republican Party, ran against Cole in the Republican primary.

Results

Democratic primary
Running in the Democratic primary were Tae Si, a software engineer, and Bert Smith, a retired teacher and retired United States Army Reserve lieutenant colonel who was the nominee for the 5th district in 2004, a candidate for the 5th district in 2006 and 2008 and a candidate for the 4th district in 2012.

Results

General election

Results

District 5

The 5th district is located in Central Oklahoma and includes Oklahoma, Pottawatomie and Seminole counties. The incumbent is Republican James Lankford, who has represented the district since 2011. He was re-elected with 59% of the vote in 2012 and the district has a PVI of R+12.

Lankford is not running for re-election. He is instead running in the special election to replace retiring Republican U.S. Senator Tom Coburn.

Republican primary

Candidates

Declared
 Patrice Douglas, chairman of the Oklahoma Corporation Commission and former mayor of Edmond
 Shane Jett, former state representative
 Clark Jolley, state senator
 Steve Russell, former state senator
 Harvey Sparks, minister and former aide to U.S. Representative Jim Bridenstine
 Mike Turner, state representative

Withdrew
 James Lankford, incumbent U.S. Representative (running for the U.S. Senate)

Declined
 Mick Cornett, Mayor of Oklahoma City
 David Holt, state senator
 Tom Newell, state representative

Polling

Results

Runoff

Democratic primary

Candidates

Declared
 Tom Guild, University of Central Oklahoma professor and nominee for the seat 2010 and 2012
 Leona Leonard, chairman of the Seminole County Democratic Party
 Al McAffrey, state senator

Withdrew
 Keith Davenport, minister
 Scott Inman, Minority Leader of the Oklahoma House of Representatives (running for re-election)
 Marilyn Rainwater, pastor, retired child welfare worker and nominee for the state house in 2012 (running for the state senate)

Declined
 Anastasia Pittman, state representative (running for the state senate) 
 Jim Roth, former Corporation Commissioner

Polling

Results

Runoff

Independent

Candidates

Declared
 Tom Boggs, resident of Thailand
 Robert T. Murphy, Libertarian and perennial candidate
 Buddy Ray

General election

Polling

Results

See also
 2014 United States House of Representatives elections
 2014 United States elections

References

External links

Campaign contributions at OpenSecrets

Oklahoma
2014
United States House